GMTV News is the brand name for the regional news service in the south coast of England and the Thames Valley, from 5 December 2006 until 6 February 2009.

The change in branding was brought about due to the launch of ITV's Thames Valley news region on 4 December 2006, which, although based at Meridian's studios, consisted of the south-east of the Central franchise area as well as the north of the Meridian area.

For this reason it was unlike the GMTV Northern Ireland and GMTV Scotland services, as it was produced by an ITV regional franchise-holder, rather than an independent company.

As GMTV at the time only paid for one regional news service per official franchisee, the regional GMTV News-branded service was a replacement for the Meridian News and Thames Valley Today programmes. In February 2009, the two programmes were merged into one Meridian News/Tonight programme, and the GMTV News brand was dropped.

2006 British television series debuts
2009 British television series endings
ITV regional news shows
Mass media in Dorset
Mass media in Essex
Mass media in Hampshire
Mass media of the Isle of Wight
Mass media in Kent
Mass media in Oxford
Mass media in Sussex
Mass media in Wiltshire
Television news in England
Television news program articles using incorrect naming style